Čelechovice na Hané is a municipality and village in Prostějov District in the Olomouc Region of the Czech Republic. It has about 1,300 inhabitants.

Administrative parts
Villages of Kaple and Studenec are administrative parts of Čelechovice na Hané.

Geography
It lies mostly in the Upper Morava Valley, the northwestern part of the municipal territory lies in the Zábřeh Highlands. Part of the Kosířské lomy National Nature Monument is located in the territory of Čelechovice na Hané.

History
The first written mention of Čelechovice na Hané is from 1315.

References

Villages in Prostějov District